Robert Grieve (28 March 1884–unknown) was a Scottish footballer who played in the Football League for Leicester Fosse and Manchester City.

References

1884 births
1954 deaths
Scottish footballers
Association football forwards
English Football League players
Greenock Morton F.C. players
Manchester City F.C. players
Accrington Stanley F.C. (1891) players
Leicester City F.C. players
Southport F.C. players
Crewe Alexandra F.C. players
Witton Albion F.C. players